Rachel Lee Priday is a Korean-American violinist.

Beginning in 1996, Priday studied with Dorothy DeLay and later Itzhak Perlman at the Juilliard School Pre-college Division.  She attended a dual degree program with Harvard University and New England Conservatory, graduating with a B.A. in English from Harvard in 2010, and a M.M. degree studying with Miriam Fried at NEC in 2011.

References

External links
 
 Rachel Lee Priday, Ariel Artists web page

American violinists
Living people
Year of birth missing (living people)
American classical musicians of Korean descent
Harvard University alumni
Juilliard School alumni
New England Conservatory alumni
Classical musicians from Illinois
21st-century violinists